Danny Fitzgerald may refer to:

Danny Fitzgerald (musician) (1933–2017), street musician
Danny Fitzgerald (sportsperson) (1961–2010), Irish hurler and Gaelic footballer